Mirza Mohammad Mihrani known as Mirza Mohammad Talish was an Iranian nobleman and prominent military commander of Talysh origin. He was a descendant of Mihranids and his ancestors were the hereditary governors of Astara. Mirza Mohammad was the governor of Astara, and later became the Safavid governor of Yazd. He was married to a sister of Sultan-Ali Beg Chākirlu, the Aq Qoyunlu governor of Ardabil.

Mirza Mohammad appears in sources from 1500. He rebuked his serving official, Hamzeh Beg, for attempting to assassinate Ismail I during his residence in Talish, but soon weakened in his own support. He was intending to betray Ismail but was dissuaded by another follower of Ismail. He was a very active campaigner for the Shah Ismail and participated in numerous expeditions. Under Shah Ismail, he was ranked among the Qizilbash tiyūl-holders. It is not clear whether he remained the government of Astara since he appeared in command of qurchi troops of Talish during these campaigns.

Another post that he held during Ismail's reign, was the superintendent of the Safavid Shrine.

References

Sources

Further reading 

 
 
 

15th-century births
15th-century Iranian military personnel
16th-century Iranian military personnel
16th-century people of Safavid Iran
Safavid generals
People from Astara, Iran
Safavid governors in Gilan
Safavid governors of Yazd
Talysh people
1535 deaths
1536 deaths